José Pedro Mourão Lamy Viçoso, OIH, known as Pedro Lamy (born 20 March 1972) is a Portuguese professional racing driver currently racing in endurance races teaming up with Mathias Lauda and gentleman driver Paul Dalla Lana. He was the first Portuguese driver to score a point in a Formula One World Championship event, in the 1995 Australian Grand Prix, for Minardi.

Racing career

Early years
Born in Aldeia Galega da Merceana, Alenquer, Portugal, Lamy graduated from karting and won the Portuguese Formula Ford Championship in his debut year, in 1989, at the age of 17. Taking on Domingos Piedade as a manager, Lamy moved to Formula Opel Lotus and won the championship in his second attempt, in 1991.

With Piedade's help, Lamy went to Germany to race in the local Formula Three series. Signing for Willi Weber's team, he defeated Marco Werner in the fight for the Championship, in 1992, also winning the Marlboro Masters in Zandvoort and finishing second in the Macau Grand Prix. In 1993 he raced for Crypton Engineering in Formula 3000 and finished second in the series, one point behind champion Olivier Panis, although he scored a win at Pau, a narrow street course considered even more difficult than Monaco.

Formula One

Lotus (1993–1994)
In , Lamy got the chance to race in the final four Formula One races of the season, replacing injured Alessandro Zanardi in the Lotus team. He scored no points, but was signed for the team to drive the full 1994 season. Lamy drove the first four races, before suffering a serious crash in private testing at Silverstone, breaking both legs and wrists and sitting in the sidelines for over a year.

Minardi (1995–1996)
After intense physical therapy, Lamy signed a contract to race in the second half of the 1995 season for Minardi, replacing Pierluigi Martini, and scoring the team's only point of the season in Adelaide, despite a spectacular spin and struggling to get going again halfway through the race. Lamy stayed with Minardi for 1996, but the team's lack of resources meant the car received little development, and the Portuguese driver finished his F1 career, after 32 Grand Prix starts.

Sports car racing

Afterwards, Lamy moved to the FIA GT Championship, where he won the GT2 class in 1998 in an Oreca Chrysler Viper GTS-R. He then raced in the Le Mans 24 Hours and the DTM for the works Mercedes team, but was unhappy with his treatment within the team.

Switching to the Zakspeed outfit, he won the 24 Hours Nürburgring twice in a row (in 2001 and 2002), taking the V8Star Series crown as well, in 2003. In 2004 he drove for BMW Motorsport in a few selected events including the 24 Hours Nürburgring that he won again. He also won the GTS class in the Le Mans Endurance Series in a Larbre Compétition Ferrari 550 Maranello. For 2005, Lamy was an Aston Martin works driver for the Sebring 12 Hours and Le Mans, also racing for BMW at the 24 Hours Nürburgring where he won again, and for the Larbre team in the FIA GT Championship.

In 2005, Lamy was announced as the driver of A1 Team Portugal in the 2005 A1 Grand Prix. However, Lamy never went beyond testing, and Álvaro Parente was appointed the main driver's seat. Instead, Lamy remained with the Aston Martin Racing squad, taking part in the American Le Mans Series and 24 Hours of Le Mans. In 2007, Lamy became a factory driver for the Peugeot 908 HDi FAP in the Le Mans Series, as well as driving the diesel-powered prototype in the 24 Hours of Le Mans. Lamy became LMP1 champion in the LMS in the first season.

In 2010, driving for BMW Motorsport, he won the 24 Hours Nürburgring for the fifth time, to tie with Marcel Tiemann for the most wins at the race. In 2012, Lamy participated in the FIA World Endurance Championship, driving a Larbre Competition Corvette C6.R in GTE-Am.

, he is a FIA (Fédération Internationale de l'Automobile) commissioner.

Racing record

Complete International Formula 3000 results
(key) (Races in bold indicate pole position) (Races in italics indicate fastest lap)

† Driver did not finish the race, but was classified as he completed over 90% of the race distance.

Complete Formula One results
(key)

24 Hours of Le Mans results

Complete FIA GT Championship results
(key) (Races in bold indicate pole position) (Races in italics indicate fastest lap)

† Not eligible for points

Complete Deutsche Tourenwagen Masters results
(key) (Races in bold indicate pole position) (Races in italics indicate fastest lap)

Complete Le Mans Series results

Notes
 – Lamy competed for the Intercontinental Le Mans Cup, no points awarded for the Le Mans Series.

Complete GT1 World Championship results
(key) (Races in bold indicate pole position) (Races in italics indicate fastest lap)

Complete FIA World Endurance Championship results
(key) (Races in bold indicate pole position) (Races in italics indicate fastest lap)

† Rank indicates standings in Drivers' World Championship.

Complete WeatherTech SportsCar Championship results
(key) (Races in bold indicate pole position) (Races in italics indicate fastest lap)

References

External links

Pedro Lamy official website

1972 births
Living people
Portuguese racing drivers
Portuguese Formula One drivers
Minardi Formula One drivers
Team Lotus Formula One drivers
FIA GT Championship drivers
Deutsche Tourenwagen Masters drivers
German Formula Three Championship drivers
24 Hours of Le Mans drivers
International Formula 3000 drivers
American Le Mans Series drivers
Rolex Sports Car Series drivers
Formula Ford drivers
EFDA Nations Cup drivers
24 Hours of Daytona drivers
European Le Mans Series drivers
FIA GT1 World Championship drivers
Porsche Supercup drivers
FIA World Endurance Championship drivers
Blancpain Endurance Series drivers
WeatherTech SportsCar Championship drivers
24 Hours of Spa drivers
24H Series drivers
Peugeot Sport drivers
Oreca drivers
Larbre Compétition drivers
Mercedes-AMG Motorsport drivers
Aston Martin Racing drivers
AF Corse drivers
Team Rosberg drivers
Audi Sport drivers
W Racing Team drivers
Draco Racing drivers
Wayne Taylor Racing drivers
Phoenix Racing drivers
Schnitzer Motorsport drivers
Nürburgring 24 Hours drivers